Paleontology in Florida refers to paleontological research occurring within or conducted by people from the U.S. state of Florida. Florida has a very rich fossil record spanning from the Eocene to recent times. Florida fossils are often very well preserved.

The oldest known fossils in Florida date back to the Eocene. At this time Florida was covered in a sea home to a variety of marine invertebrates and the primitive whales, such as Basilosaurus. During the later Miocene Florida was exposed as dry land again due to geologic uplift and mountain building. In the Florida Keys, however, coral reefs were forming. The marine environments of Pliocene Florida were home to creatures like dugongs, porpoises, sharks, and whales. On land, camels, dogs, horses, relatives of modern elephants, saber toothed cats, and tapirs inhabited the state. The period of time best documented in the fossil record of Florida is the Pleistocene epoch. In fact, Florida is the best source of Pleistocene mammals in the world. Among them were short-faced bears, saber-toothed cats, glyptodonts, mammoths, mastodons, giant ground sloths, and wolves.

Prehistory

Florida has a very rich fossil record. Its geologic history is also complex. The rock underlying Florida was originally part of Gondwana and did not become part of North America until the Permian, when Pangaea formed. During the Mesozoic Pangaea began to divide again and Florida was left attached to North America. However, no dinosaur fossils are known from the state though they likely lived there. In fact no fossils are known from surface deposits older than the Eocene. Nevertheless, the geologic record contributes to science's ability to reconstruct the history of Florida's changing Mesozoic environment. During the Cretaceous the Florida peninsula was much wider due to regions now submerged as continental shelf being exposed to the air. Later into the Cretaceous northern Florida was covered by rising seas connecting the Gulf of Mexico to the Atlantic. This passage of water was called the Suwannee Straits.

A shallow sea grew to cover most of the state during the Paleogene. Clams, echinoderms, and gastropods lived here. Cenozoic limestone formed in such environments is common in Florida and rich in fossils. The oldest fossil-bearing geologic deposits in Florida are of Eocene age. During the Eocene, primitive whales like Basilosaurus swam over Florida. Other inhabitants included large numbers of shelled invertebrates, sharks, and sirenians. Oligocene fossils in Florida provide evidence for a diverse terrestrial fauna. During the early Miocene uplift and mountain building filled in the Suwannee Strait. At this point coral reefs were forming in the Florida Keys. The Thomas Farm Quarry is the richest source of Miocene mammal fossils in the eastern US. During the ensuing Pliocene, Florida was home to amphibians, bears, a variety of birds, camelids, crocodilians, deer, dogs, dugongs, at least six genera of horses, peccaries, porpoises, relatives of modern elephants, rays, saber toothed cats, seals, sharks, tapirs, turtles, and whales. The remains of all these creatures have been found in a region of Polk County called Bone Valley. Late Tertiary vertebrate fossils are known from southern Florida. during these animals' lifetimes the southern 300 kilometers of Florida was still under water. Late Tertiary sediments of Gilchrist County preserve badgers, Kodiak bears, camels, dogs, horses, rhinos and more. Mammoths, mastodons, sloths, giant beavers, and ungulates were preserved near Gainesville.

The Pleistocene limestones of the Florida Keys are rich in fossils. The Pleistocene is the epoch of time best represented in Florida's fossil record. In fact, Florida's Pleistocene sediments are regarded as the best source of Pleistocene fossils in the world, especially for the mammals of that age. Also, Pleistocene Florida had a greater diversity of terrestrial vertebrates than any other place and time in North American history. At the time, the local sea level began to rise and fall along with the amount of water tied up in the glaciers covering the northern part of the continent. When the sea would withdraw savannas formed. Herds of American mastodon and Columbian mammoth browsed and grazed on the local foliage. The gigantic ground sloth Eremotherium was another contemporary large herbivore. Others included the antelope, bison, deer, armored glyptodonts, and the modern horse. These were preyed upon by predators like short-faced bears, jaguars, saber-toothed cats, lions, dire wolves, and wolves.

History
In 1931, a farmer uncovered some bones while plowing his field. He thought he had stumbled on a Native American graveyard. However, the bones turned out to be fossils and were bought by the University of Florida. The prehistoric creatures whose remains were preserved here include a large dog-like bear, two different kinds of camels, several different species of horse, and a pig-like animal. In 1963 several new Miocene fossil sites were discovered. One was found in the far northern region of the state, near its border with Georgia. Another was found near Ocala and a third discovery occurred in Hernando County. The Hernando County site preserved the remains of animals like alligators, members of the dog family, oreodonts, rhinoceroses, and tapirs.

Protected areas
 Windley Key Fossil Reef Geological State Park

Notable paleontologist

Deaths
 Walter Auffenberg died in Gainesville on January 17, 2004 at age 75.
 Pierce Brodkorb died in Gainesville on July 18, 1992.
 Cesare Emiliani died in Palm Beach Gardens on 20 July 1995

Natural history museums
Florida Museum of Natural History, Gainesville
South Florida Museum, Bradenton

Notable clubs and associations

 Bone Valley Fossil Society
 Florida Fossil Hunters
 Florida Paleontological Society
 Fossil Club of Miami
 Southwest Florida Fossil Club
 Tampa Bay Fossil Club

Events
 Fossil Fair

Footnotes

References

 
 
 
 Picconi, J. E. 2003. The Teacher-Friendly Guide to the Geology of the Southeastern U.S. Paleontological Research Institution, Ithaca, NY.
 Portell, Roger,  Richard Hulbert, Dale Springer, Judy Scotchmoor. June 29, 2005. "Florida, US." The Paleontology Portal. Accessed September 21, 2012.

External links
 Geologic units in Florida
 Florida Department of Environmental Protection
 Florida Fossil Hunters

 
Florida
Natural history of Florida
Science and technology in Florida